Kramarić is a Croatian surname and Kramarič is a Croatian and Slovene one. Notable people with the surname include:

Andrej Kramarić (born 1991), Croatian footballer
Mirko Kramarić (born 1989), Croatian footballer
Martin Kramarič (born 1997), Slovenian footballer
Zlatko Kramarić (born 1956), Croatian politician 

Croatian surnames
Slavic-language surnames
Patronymic surnames